Alfredo Lazarte Juinio was a civil engineer, educator, and public official of the Philippines. He served as the dean of the College of Engineering of the University of the Philippines. Alfredo Juinio Hall, the building that houses the National Engineering Center, is named after him.  He was once described as "one of the country's most brilliant engineers."

Education

In 1939, Juinio graduated cum laude with a degree in civil engineering from the University of the Philippines where he became a member of the Beta Epsilon Fraternity. He then attended the Massachusetts Institute of Technology, from which he obtained his master's degree in civil engineering.

Career and Works

Prior to serving as college dean, Professor Alfredo T. Juinio headed the UP Diliman Office of Campus Planning (also known as the Campus Planning Committee). Two of the projects he undertook during his term were the construction of C.P. Garcia Avenue and the UP Gateway at the University Avenue.

Juinio, together with other UP engineering professors, became the structural engineers of the first thin-shell concrete dome in the Philippines for the UP Catholic Chapel, otherwise known as the Parish of the Holy Sacrifice. The structure is the country's first circular church with the altar in the middle and has been declared a historical landmark and cultural treasure by the National Historical Institute and the National Museum, respectively.

Juinio was appointed as the Minister of Public Works and Highways, as well as the administrator of the National Irrigation Administration. During his term, he headed the Upper Pampanga River Multipurpose Projects in Pantabangan, Nueva Ecija.

From 1970 to 1979, Juinio served as the dean of the UP College of Engineering. During his term, he initiated the establishment of the National Engineering Center building, as well as the formation of the UP Engineering Research and Development Foundation, Inc. (UPERDFI). Juinio was elected as the first chairman of the board, and went on to serve as UPERDFI president for thirty years.

Juinio was also the co-founder of the DCCD Engineering Corporation and a consultant to various government agencies.

Awards

Meralco Award for Engineering and Applied Sciences, 1990
Most Distinguished Engineering Alumnus, given during the Diamond Jubilee of the UP College of Engineering, 1985
Most Outstanding Betan Award, given by the Beta Epsilon Fraternity, 1999

References

UP COE History. Retrieved on October 30, 2006.
A church of the people and history. Retrieved on October 30, 2006.
Parish of the Holy Sacrifice declared a National Treasure. Retrieved on October 30, 2006.
DCCD History. Retrieved on October 30, 2006.

Academic staff of the University of the Philippines
University of the Philippines alumni
20th-century Filipino engineers
Filipino educators
MIT School of Engineering alumni
Secretaries of Public Works and Highways of the Philippines
Ferdinand Marcos administration cabinet members